UFC Fight Night: Swanson vs. Stephens (also known as UFC Fight Night 44) was a mixed martial arts event held at the AT&T Center in San Antonio, Texas.

Background
The event was the first that the organization has hosted in San Antonio. Zuffa hosted a World Extreme Cagefighting event, WEC 43, there in 2009.

The event was headlined by a featherweight bout between Cub Swanson and Jeremy Stephens.

Rani Yahya was expected to face Johnny Bedford in a rematch from their bout at UFC Fight Night 39.  However, Yahya was forced out of the bout and was replaced by Cody Gibson.

A welterweight bout between Sean Spencer and Luiz Dutra was official for this card but had to be cancelled due to an injury.

Myles Jury was scheduled to face Abel Trujillo at the event. However, Jury pulled out of the bout with an injury and was replaced by Francisco  Treviño. Subsequently, Treviño's originally scheduled opponent on the card, Joe Ellenberger, was briefly linked to bouts with newcomers Johnny Case and Bryan Barberena.  However, Case and Barberena were removed just days after being announced as well and were eventually replaced by another newcomer James Moontasri. Then on June 9, Treviño pulled out of the bout and Trujillo was removed from the card entirely.

Ray Borg was scheduled to face Ryan Benoit at the event. However, on June 18 it was announced that Benoit had to pull out of the fight due to injury and was replaced by promotional newcomer Shane Howell.

Co-main event fighter Kelvin Gastelum initially weighed in over the 171 pound welterweight limit at 173 pounds.  His subsequent efforts to make weight over the next two hours failed, hence he was forced to surrender 20 percent of his purse to opponent Nico Musoke.

Results

Bonus awards
The following fighters were awarded $50,000 bonuses:
 Fight of the Night: Cub Swanson vs. Jeremy Stephens
 Performance of the Night: Ray Borg and Carlos Diego Ferreira

See also
List of UFC events
2014 in UFC

References

UFC Fight Night
Mixed martial arts in Texas
Sports competitions in San Antonio
2014 in mixed martial arts
Events in San Antonio